The president of the Republic of Liberia is the head of state and government of Liberia. The president serves as the leader of the executive branch and as commander-in-chief of the Armed Forces of Liberia.

Prior to the independence of Liberia in 1847, executive power in the Commonwealth of Liberia was held by the governor of Liberia, who was appointed by the American Colonization Society. The 1847 Constitution transferred the executive powers of the governorship to the presidency, which was largely modeled on the presidency of the United States.

Between 1847 and 1980, the presidency was exclusively held by Americo-Liberians, the original American settlers of Liberia and their descendants. The original two-party system, with the Republican Party and the True Whig Party, ended in 1878, when the election of Anthony W. Gardiner marked the beginning of 102 years of one-party rule by the True Whigs. Following a coup d'état by disgruntled army officers led by Samuel Doe in 1980, one-party rule of the True Whigs ended and the presidency was vacated until the election of Doe in the 1985 general election. After his overthrow and murder in 1990, the presidency was again vacated for seven years during the First Liberian Civil War and again for two years following the conclusion of the Second Liberian Civil War in 2003.

Under the 1986 Constitution, the president is directly elected by eligible voters to a six-year term, which may be renewed once. Overall, 25 individuals have served as president, including Ellen Johnson Sirleaf, the first elected female head of state in Africa. On January 22, 2018, George Weah was sworn in as the twenty-fifth and current president of Liberia.

History
Following the establishment of the Commonwealth of Liberia in 1838, executive power was vested in the governor of Liberia, who was appointed and served at the pleasure of the American Colonization Society. The first governor, Thomas Buchanan, served from 1838 until his death in 1841. He was succeeded by Joseph Jenkins Roberts, the first person of African descent to serve as governor of Liberia.

Upon independence in 1847, Roberts was elected as the first president of Liberia. The 1847 Constitution denied suffrage to the indigenous population by requiring voters to own real estate. As a result, the presidency was exclusively held by Americo-Liberians until 1980, when a military coup led by Samuel Doe, an ethnic Krahn, overthrew and murdered President William Tolbert.

The presidency was vacant from 1980 to 1986, with executive power held by Doe as the head of the People's Redemption Council. Doe was later elected president in the 1985 general election, making him the first president outside of the Americo-Liberian elite. Doe was later overthrown and murdered in 1990 following the commencement First Liberian Civil War, during which the presidency remained vacant.

Following the 1997 general election, Charles Taylor held the presidency until his resignation on August 11, 2003 as part of a peace deal to end the Second Liberian Civil War. His successor, Moses Blah, ceded executive power on October 13 of that year to Gyude Bryant, the chairman of the National Transitional Government of Liberia. The presidency was resumed on January 16, 2006 following the 2005 election of Ellen Johnson Sirleaf as the first female president.

George Weah was elected in 2017 as the 23rd president of Liberia. Incumbent president Ellen Johnson Sirleaf signed Executive Order No. 91, thus establishing a Joint Presidential Transition Team, due to the fact that Liberia had "not experienced the transfer of power from one democratically elected president to another democratically elected president for over 70 years [...]".

Powers and duties
The presidency of Liberia is largely modeled on the presidency of the United States.

Executive functions
The 1986 Constitution gives the president the power to appoint all cabinet ministers, judges, ambassadors, sheriffs, county officials and military officers with the advice and consent of the Senate. Additionally, the president has the power to dismiss all appointees from office at his or her discretion. The president may also grant pardons or revoke sentences and fines. The president conducts all matters of foreign policy, though any treaties or international agreements must be ratified by both houses of the Legislature. Furthermore, the president serves as the commander-in-chief of the Armed Forces of Liberia.

The Constitution also grants the president the power to declare a state of emergency during times of war or civil unrest and suspend civil liberties during the emergency as necessary, with the exception of habeas corpus. Within seven days of the declaration, the president must state to the Legislature the reasons for the declaration, which both houses must then approve by a two-thirds majority. Otherwise, the president must repeal the state of emergency.

Legislative functions
The president must sign all legislation passed by the House of Representatives and Senate. The president may choose to veto any legislation, which may be overturned by a two-thirds majority in both houses. Additionally, the president may exercise a pocket veto by refusing to sign legislation when the end of the twenty-day deadline for signing the bill falls during a recess of the legislature. The president may extend a legislative session past its adjournment date or call a special extraordinary session when deemed necessary for the national interest. The president must also give an annual report to the legislature on the state of the country.

Eligibility
To be eligible for office under the current Constitution, a presidential candidate must:
be a natural born citizen of Liberia (per Art, 27(b) of the Constitution, citizenship is limited to "persons who are Negroes or of Negro descent");
be at least thirty-five years old;
own real property valued at least $25,000;
have resided in Liberia for at least ten years.

Additionally, the president may not be from the same county as the vice president of Liberia.

Term and election
Under the original 1847 Constitution, the president was elected to a two-year term, which was increased to four years on May 7, 1907. Under this amendment, a new president would serve for eight years and could be re-elected to unlimited four-year terms.  During the presidency of William Tolbert, the Constitution was amended to restrict the president to a single eight-year term; by 1976, voices in the legislature were being raised in favor of returning to the previous system, but Tolbert proclaimed his support for the existing system and vowed to veto any constitutional amendments to remove term limits.

Currently, the president is elected by popular vote to a six-year term and is limited to two terms. Under the 1986 Constitution, presidential elections utilize a two-round system, wherein a second round of voting is held between the two candidates with the highest number of votes if no single candidate obtains a majority in the first round. Each term begins and ends at noon on the third working Monday in January of the year immediately following the elections. At the time of their inauguration, each president is required under the Constitution to take a presidential oath promising to preserve and defend the Constitution and faithfully execute the law. The oath is administered by the chief justice of Liberia in front of a joint session of the legislature.

Residence

In 2006, the Executive Mansion was under renovations due to a fire that damaged parts of the building in July of that year. The office of the president was transferred to the nearby Foreign Ministry building as a result. On 14 February 2022, the Executive Mansion was reopened.

List of officeholders 

Political parties

Other factions

Timeline

See also
Lists of office-holders
List of current heads of state and government

History:
Agents and governors of Liberia

Notes

References
 Enno Schulz, "Presidents of Liberia.

Presidents
Liberia
 
1840s establishments in Liberia